Mrs. Leonel Campbell Ross O'Bryan (1857–1938), known under the pen name Polly Pry, was a controversial reporter for the Denver Post and later as a freelancer in the late nineteenth and early twentieth centuries.  She is best remembered for her connection to the case of Alferd Packer as an investigative reporter.

Early life

Pry was born to a wealthy family in 1857. Aged fifteen, she eloped to Mexico with a railroad industrialist named George Anthony. Five years later, Pry left Anthony and moved to New York to become a reporter. While initially being rejected by the New York Times, she succeeded in getting a trial assignment on a recent slum fire. The article she then produced was good enough to earn her a full time job there. 

In 1898, Pry was hired by Frederick Bonfils for the Denver Post, becoming the paper's first female reporter.

Relationship with Packer

Pry met Alferd Packer  in 1901 while she was writing an article on the prison where he was incarcerated. She advocated for him in print throughout the trial, helping to win his release.

After the trial, she was present during a confrontation between the attorney for Packer, hired by the owners of the Post. They learned that the attorney had taken a double payment, demanding he return the money. During the confrontation, the attorney, W.W. "Plughat" Anderson, pulled a gun and shot both of the men; as he prepared to shoot again she jumped in front of H.H. Tammen, trying to shield him. Anderson threatened to shoot her if she didn't move; however, she stalled him long enough for the police to arrive and used her skirt to stop the bleeding. Later, rumors began circulating that her skirts saved her publishers' lives by slowing down bullets from the gun.

Later life

When union workers boycotted the Post for her stance on labor issues and immigration, she founded her own paper, Polly Pry.  This brought further attacks from gunmen on her, this time in her home rather than her workplace.

She was a strong advocate of free speech and came to the aid of French war orphans during World War I.

Pry passed away on 16 July 1938, aged eighty.

In popular culture
Two film versions of the Alferd Packer story have included Polly Pry.  In Jim Roberson's The Legend of Alfred Packer (1980), she was portrayed by Cynthia Nessin.  The incident with Anderson (who was not named, and called "Gunman" in the credits) was included, but after she begins telling Packer's story, she does not appear again in the film, involved or otherwise, and the shooting is not mentioned again.  She is depicted as a hard-drinking and forceful person.  Trey Parker's Cannibal! The Musical featured Toddy Walters in the role, which went more deeply into her involvement with the case but ignored the fact that she was married in order to make her a love interest for Packer.

References

1857 births
1938 deaths